Vancroft, also known as Mt. St. George Historic District, is a historic home and national historic district. It is located near Wellsburg, Brooke County, West Virginia. It encompasses 10 contributing buildings, one contributing structure, and one contributing object associated with the manor house.  The manor house was designed by Alden & Harlow in 1901 for steel magnate Joseph B. Vandergrift. It is a Shingle Style dwelling with broad gable roofs, a rough stone turret, and stone chimney.  Also on the property are a pergola, a club house or retreat house, spring house, race track, grotto, farm manager's house, two farm laborer's residences, mill, barn, and "the Apple House."  The property was purchased by the Catholic Knights of St. George and operated as a home for the aged. In 1998, it was purchased by the Catholic Knights of America.

It was listed on the National Register of Historic Places in 1986.

In 2022, the estate was listed for sale at 3.8 million dollars.

References

External links
West Virginia Encyclopedia article: Mount St. George

Houses on the National Register of Historic Places in West Virginia
Farms on the National Register of Historic Places in West Virginia
Historic districts in Brooke County, West Virginia
Shingle Style architecture in West Virginia
Houses completed in 1901
Houses in Brooke County, West Virginia
National Register of Historic Places in Brooke County, West Virginia
Historic districts on the National Register of Historic Places in West Virginia